Maha Cartoon TV was a cable and satellite television channel that is owned by Teleone Consumers Product Pvt. Ltd. It was founded by Darshan Singh and Vishvajeet Sharma. The channel was launched on 1 November 2016. The channel is primarily aimed at children and adolescents aged 4–14 free-to-air channel. It was replaced by Maha Punjabi in 2019.

History 
Teleone Consumers Private Ltd came into existence in 1998 and is the parent company of Maha Cartoon TV. Maha Cartoon TV carries the franchise title that was incepted with the precursor channel Maha Movie. According to the official press release, the channel was created to fill the idle space for a Hindi free-to-air channel.

Programming 
Maha Cartoon TV’s current schedule consists largely of original series aimed at children and pre-teens. The shows that air on the channel are:

 Mooshak Gungun
 Bal Chanakya
 Panchatantra Stories
 Akbar & Birbal
 Ciko se Sikho
 Techno Kids

The channel also airs a variety of foreign content, including
 Plantimon – A Journey of an Adventure
 Super Ninjas
 Bali: The Jungle Warrior
 Sooryanagar Ke Saahasi
 Charlie Chaplin show
 Doremon
 Pokémon
 Rubi
 Alien Zoo
 Samson and Neon (Samson et Néon)
 KungFu Dragon
 Abu: The Little Dinosaur
 Professor Thompson
 Raven Tales
 The Dream Town
 Ejen Ali

The channel has a future plan to air movies.

References 

Cable television in India
Indian animation
Television channels and stations established in 2016
2016 establishments in Delhi